The England cricket team toured South Africa from 15 December 2015 to 21 February 2016. The tour consisted of four Test matches, five One Day International and two Twenty20 International matches. England won the Test series 2–1. South Africa won the ODI series 3–2 and the T20I series 2–0.

Squads

Steven Finn was added to England's Test squad on 14 December 2015. Following the conclusion of the first Test, Quinton de Kock and Chris Morris were added to the South African squad. South Africa later added Hardus Viljoen to their squad as cover for Kyle Abbott. Hashim Amla resigned from the captaincy at the end of the second Test with AB de Villiers replacing him for the rest of the series. Dale Steyn only played in the first Test and was ruled out of the rest of the series with a shoulder injury. Dane Vilas was added to South Africa's Test squad as a late replacement for Quinton de Kock, who suffered a knee injury. Vilas was due to play in the Sunfoil Series and had to catch a flight from Port Elizabeth to Johannesburg on the morning of the third Test. Stephen Cook was added to South Africa's squad ahead of the fourth Test, with Rilee Rossouw being released to play in the Sunfoil Series.

Liam Plunkett was added to England's limited-overs squad as replacement for Finn, who suffered a side strain during the 3rd Test. However, Plunkett would later suffer from injury too, and was replaced by Stuart Broad. Dale Steyn was ruled out of the ODI series with a shoulder injury. Marchant de Lange was added to South Africa's ODI squad.

Quinton de Kock was selected for the T20I series, but was rested for both games. AB de Villiers kept wicket for South Africa in his absence.

Tour matches

Three-day: South African Invitation XI v England XI

First-class: South Africa A v England XI

List A: South Africa A v England XI

T20: South Africa A v England XI

Test series

1st Test

2nd Test

3rd Test

4th Test

ODI series

1st ODI

2nd ODI

3rd ODI

4th ODI

5th ODI

T20I series

1st T20I

2nd T20I

Notes

References

External links
England tour of South Africa, 2015-16 at ESPNcricinfo.com

2015 in English cricket
2015 in South African cricket
International cricket competitions in 2015–16
2015-16